Róbert Répássy (born 18 May 1968) is a Hungarian lawyer and politician who has been the Secretary of State for Ministry of Public Administration and Justice (since 2014 Ministry of Justice) from 2 June 2010 to 8 October 2015 and since 11 December 2021. He became a member of the National Assembly (MP) in the 1998 parliamentary election. He was also MP between 1993 and 1994, as the youngest sitting parliamentarian.

Personal life
He is married to Éva Répássyné Kónya. They have two sons, András and Mihály.

References

1968 births
Living people
Hungarian jurists
Fidesz politicians
Members of the National Assembly of Hungary (1990–1994)
Members of the National Assembly of Hungary (1998–2002)
Members of the National Assembly of Hungary (2002–2006)
Members of the National Assembly of Hungary (2006–2010)
Members of the National Assembly of Hungary (2010–2014)
Members of the National Assembly of Hungary (2014–2018)
People from Miskolc